Kanimbla may refer to:

, several ships of Royal Australian Navy
Kanimbla a Sydney K-class ferry
Kanimbla-class landing platform amphibious
Kanimbla, Queensland, a suburb of the city of Cairns in Australia

Kanimbla Valley, a valley in New South Wales, see list of valleys of Australia